Moshkenan (also Romanized as Moshkenān; also known as Mashgenān, Moshgenān, Moshgnan, Mūshkānān, and Mushkinān) is a village in Tudeshk Rural District, Kuhpayeh District, Isfahan County, Isfahan Province, Iran. At the 2006 census, its population was 466, in 136 families.

References 

Populated places in Isfahan County